USS Electra has been the name of two ships in the service of the United States Navy.   Both ships are named after the star Electra, which in turn is named for Electra the daughter of Agamemnon and Clytemnestra in Greek mythology.

 , a barque purchased by the navy in 1847
 , an  launched in 1941

United States Navy ship names